SV Meppen is a German association football club playing in Meppen, Lower Saxony. The club was founded on 29 November 1912 as Amisia Meppen and joined Männer-Turnverein Meppen on 8 February 1920 to form TuS Meppen 1912. The football branch left TuS Meppen in 1921 to create a separate club called Sport Verein Meppen 1912 e.V.. SV Meppen spent a total of 11 years in the 2. Bundesliga.

History

Meppen have had a relatively quiet history playing in III and IV level circles, winning their first title of any sort when they claimed the Amateurliga Lower Saxony (IV) championship in 1961. They claimed a second title there in 1968 and then qualified for the Regionalliga Nord (II) in 1972. After league re-structuring in 1974 the team played in the Oberliga Nord (III) where they won the championship in 1987 and then emerged out the promotion playoffs to join the 2. Bundesliga.

Generally, the side ended up in mid-table with their best finishes being 7th in 1994 and 6th in 1995. Meppen played their way into the final eight of the 1997 DFB-Pokal competition on the strength of a memorable 6–1 victory over Eintracht Frankfurt. The club's eleven-year run on the professional circuit ended in 1998 and they began a slide that landed them in the Oberliga Nord (V), where played half a dozen seasons burdened by ongoing financial problems. During the new century Meppen dropped to the Niedersachsenliga (5th division). They won the championship in 2011 and advanced to the Regionalliga Nord, which they won in 2017 to return to the 3. Liga.

Honours
 Amateurliga Niedersachsen (III)
 Champions: 1968
 Oberliga Nord (III)
 Champions: 1987
 Regionalliga Nord (IV)
 Champions: 2017
 Niedersachsenliga (V)
 Champions: 2011
 Lower Saxony Cup
 Winners: 1999, 2021
 Runners-up: 2015, 2019, 2022

Players

Current squad

Out on loan

Women's team

Stadium
The "MEP-Arena" is located in northern Meppen on Lathener Strasse. Construction on the site was finished in 1924 and the stadium was named "Hindenburg Stadion" two years later. In 1992 the stadium was renamed "Emsland-Stadion". A sponsorship deal in 2011 currently has the stadium branded as "MEP-Arena". The stadium's largest ever crowd of 18,000 spectators watched SV Meppen play a 1982 friendly against a Barcelona team that included Diego Maradona. Today the stadium has a capacity of 13,696.

Literature
 Hans Vinke: Die Meppen-Story, Geschichte eines Fußball-Phänomens, 1997,

References

External links

 

 
Football clubs in Germany
1912 establishments in Germany
Association football clubs established in 1912
Football clubs in Lower Saxony
Frauen-Bundesliga clubs
Emsland (region)
2. Bundesliga clubs
3. Liga clubs